Sinaw is a city in Oman. It is known for its cattle market and its souk.

History 
Sinaw is considered to be one of the most vital markets in the eastern region of Oman, in addition to Sur Market and Ibra Market.  It is an urban city with some rural features, due to the surrounding desert.  In the last century some of the city locals found some buried treasure, which included pre-Islamic specie and bore some resemblance to coins of the same era found in Russia.  Other coins were minted during the Ummayyad Era in the Arabian peninsula.'''

See also 
 Railway stations in Oman - planned

References

External links 
 https://books.google.com/books?id=tbr4_KpOzEgC&pg=PA211

Populated places in Oman